United Internet AG is a global Internet services company headquartered in Montabaur, Rhineland-Palatinate, Germany. The company is structured in two business areas, Access and Applications, and has a total of 16 brands and numerous subsidiaries. The well-known brands under the umbrella of United Internet AG include 1&1, IONOS, GMX, WEB.DE and 1&1 Versatel. 

United Internet AG is listed in MDAX, TecDAX - going public in 1998 (under the name 1&1 Internet AG &Co. KGaA).

United Internet comprises over 27 million customer accounts and runs business in over 30 locations across the world.

History 
The history of the Group goes back to 1&1 EDV-Marketing GmbH, which was founded in 1988 by Ralph Dommermuth and Wendelin Abresch as a service provider for marketing and advertising. In the 1990s, the company grew into a large corporation that offered web hosting packages as well as its own online service that allowed users to dial up to the Internet.

In March 1998, the company went public under the name 1&1 Internet AG &Co. KGaA. It later becomes United Internet AG, under whose umbrella the 1&1 brand stands for Internet access products. Ordinary shares with a notional share of capital stock of one euro each were used. United Internet's IPO took place before the peak of the New Economy, but the share reached a closing price of over 200 percent of the issue price on the first day of trading.

Between 2000 and 2003, the subsidiary 1&1 entered various foreign markets, including the UK, France and the USA. In May 2005, United Internet acquired the portal and e-mail business of Web.de, which was merged with its in-house offering GMX to form 1&1 Mail & Media GmbH.

In December 2008, it was announced that the company would take over united-domains AG, based in Starnberg, Germany, for around € 34 million.

In May 2009, United Internet announced the acquisition of the DSL business of Freenet AG. As a result, the company's DSL customers - most recently around 700,000 - were transferred to United Internet for a total of 123 million euros. As a result of the takeover, the connections of former Freenet customers temporarily failed to work, while former Tiscali customers had their connections switched off in this context.

The AdLink Group has no longer belonged to United Internet since July 2009; it was sold to the French group Hi-Media.

On September 3, 2014, United Internet announced that the remaining 74.9% of shares in the fixed-line and fiber-optic network operator Versatel GmbH, or its parent company, would be taken over economically retroactively as of July 1, 2014 by the previous main shareholder, the private equity company KKR. Shortly afterwards, the company was renamed 1&1 Versatel.

On July 10, 2015, the acquisition of the Polish web host home.pl for around 135 million euros was announced.

On December 15, 2016, United Internet announced its intention to acquire its largest European competitor Strato for around EUR 600 million; the purchase was completed on April 1, 2017. In 2016, 1&1 Internet SE also split into two business divisions: 1&1 Telecommunications SE, which continues to operate the Consumer Access (DSL & Mobile) business, and the internationally active Business Applications division with the current IONOS brand for hosting and cloud service.

In 2017, 1&1 Telecommunication SE and the then Drillisch AG merged to form a fourth force in the German telecommunications market - today's 1&1 AG. In addition to 1&1, the brands of 1&1 AG also include the brands of Drillisch Online GmbH (including yourfone, smartmobil.de WinSIM). In 2019, 1&1 AG successfully participated in the 5G frequency auction of the German Federal Network Agency and is now in the construction phase of the first fully virtualized mobile network in Europe based on the new OpenRAN technology.

United Internet AG now has around 10,000 employees at more than 30 locations worldwide and posted sales of around EUR 5.6 billion in fiscal year 2021.

Founder Ralph Dommermuth holds over 50 percent of the shares in United Internet AG.

Subsidiaries 
United Internet is the parent company of three major webmail providers: GMX Mail and  Web.de, which are predominantly European providers, and Mail.com whose users are mainly from the US and the UK. It also owns Ionos, a domain registrar and web hosting provider. Furthermore it owns 1&1 which is running the DSL and mobile network business in Germany. 1&1 Versatel (deWP: 1&1 Versatel) is running the B2B access business and owns a 52,000 kilometer optical fiber network.

References

External links 

 

Companies based in Rhineland-Palatinate
Internet service providers of Germany
Companies in the TecDAX
Companies in the MDAX
German companies established in 1988